Cineflix Media is a Canadian global media production and distribution company. Headquartered in Montreal, Quebec,  Canada, it has branches in Toronto, New York City, London, and Dublin.

Subsidiaries include United Kingdom-based Cineflix Rights, which handles international distribution of factual and scripted programming; Cineflix Studios, which provides co-production, co-financing, and distribution of scripted content for the United States, Canada, and international markets; and Cineflix Productions, its television production and development company based in Toronto and New York. Cineflix also has a partnership in production company Buccaneer Media which has produced shows such as Marcella.

Productions 

 American Pickers
 Animal House: A Dog's Life
 Battle Factory
 Canadian Pickers
 Cash and Cari
 Copper
 Crash of the Century
 The Deed
 The Deed: Chicago
 The Detectives Club: New Orleans
 Dogs with Jobs
 The Filthy Rich Guide
 Final 24
 Flipping Virgins
 Food Factory
 Food Factory USA
 Gangland Undercover
 Home Factory
 How It's Made
 Into the Unknown
 Mayday (Air Crash Investigation)
 Marcella
 Motives & Murders: Cracking the Case
 My Teenage Wedding
 Property Brothers
 Property Brothers: Buying + Selling
 Property Virgins
 Pure
 Style Factory
 Surviving Evil
 Trapped
 Urban Legends
 Weird or What?
 Wynonna Earp
 Zero Hour

References

External links 
 Official website

2002 establishments in Canada
Companies based in Montreal
Privately held companies of Canada
Television production companies of Canada